Alberto Zapater Arjol (born 13 June 1985) is a Spanish professional footballer who plays for and captains Real Zaragoza mainly as a defensive midfielder.

He spent most of his career with Zaragoza, appearing in 392 official games and scoring 11 goals.

Club career

Zaragoza
Zapater was born in Ejea de los Caballeros, Province of Zaragoza. In 2004, he was first touted as a promising player after scoring 12 goals for hometown's Real Zaragoza in the youth leagues.

The first-team manager, former Spanish international Víctor Muñoz, was impressed enough, allowing Zapater to join the first team in pre-season training. He was given his official debut on Zaragoza's first game of 2004–05, against Valencia CF in the Spanish Supercup: although the Aragonese ended up losing 0–1 he put up a solid performance overall, confirmed in the 3–1 second leg away win.
 
At just 19, Zapater went on to feature in 31 La Liga matches during the league campaign, netting in a 2 March 2005 defeat at Real Sociedad where he was also sent off. In the following season, he helped the club finish as runners-up in the Copa del Rey – losing the final to RCD Espanyol – while also only missing three league matches; his strong tackling and the amount of fouls he committed earned him the nickname of 'The Bull', given by Diego Maradona.

In the following two seasons, after renewing his contract until June 2010, Zapater remained an undisputed starter, only missing four games while experiencing qualification honours to the UEFA Cup in 2006–07, and relegation the following year.

Abroad
In late July 2009, after being instrumental in Zaragoza's return to the top division, and already playing pre-season football with the Maños, Zapater left for Genoa C.F.C. for around €4.5 million, as the Spaniards were also immerse in a deep financial crisis. He held an emotional press conference before parting ways with his boyhood team, whilst fans paid tribute to the player dedicating a song to him.

On 17 September 2009, Zapater had the distinction of scoring the first ever goal in the Europa League proper, with a fourth-minute strike against SK Slavia Prague. He started throughout most of his debut season in Serie A – his maiden appearance in the competition being marked with a goal and an assist in a 3–2 home win over A.S. Roma– as Genoa finished in mid-table. Before the end of the campaign and during the subsequent off-season he was linked with a move to several clubs, but nothing ever materialised.

Zapater was sold to Sporting CP on 30 July 2010, as Miguel Veloso moved in the opposite direction. Used intermittently in his only season he did appear in 34 official games for the Lions, scoring four times.

On 3 August 2011, Zapater moved to FC Lokomotiv Moscow on a free transfer, signing a five-year contract. He made his first Russian Premier League appearance on 11 September, setting up Manuel da Costa's goal in a 4–2 win over FC Zenit Saint Petersburg. In an interview with a newspaper from his native region (El Periódico de Aragón) in late 2012, he spoke of his development in the new reality and his efforts to learn the Russian language.

Return to Zaragoza
On 19 June 2016, Zapater returned to Zaragoza after agreeing to a two-year deal.

International career
Zapater took part in the 2005 FIFA World Youth Championship, in a Spanish team that also featured future senior internationals Cesc Fàbregas, Fernando Llorente and David Silva. He scored his first and the only goal in a 3–1 defeat to Argentina in the quarter-finals.

After that, Zapater immediately established himself as an under-21 regular.

Career statistics

Honours
Zaragoza
Supercopa de España: 2004
Copa del Rey runner-up: 2005–06

References

External links

1985 births
Living people
People from Cinco Villas, Aragon
Sportspeople from the Province of Zaragoza
Spanish footballers
Footballers from Aragon
Association football midfielders
La Liga players
Segunda División players
Real Zaragoza players
Serie A players
Genoa C.F.C. players
Primeira Liga players
Sporting CP footballers
Russian Premier League players
FC Lokomotiv Moscow players
Spain youth international footballers
Spain under-21 international footballers
Spanish expatriate footballers
Expatriate footballers in Italy
Expatriate footballers in Portugal
Expatriate footballers in Russia
Spanish expatriate sportspeople in Italy
Spanish expatriate sportspeople in Portugal
Spanish expatriate sportspeople in Russia